Kurt Thomas Busch (born August 4, 1978) is an American professional auto racing driver. He last competed full-time in the NASCAR Cup Series in 2022, driving the No. 45 Toyota Camry TRD for 23XI Racing. He is the 2004 NASCAR Cup Series champion and the 2017 Daytona 500 winner. He is the older brother of two-time Cup Series champion Kyle Busch.

Busch has driven for Chip Ganassi Racing, Stewart-Haas Racing, Furniture Row Racing, Phoenix Racing, Penske Racing, and Roush Racing in his Cup career, which began in 2000. He is the winner of thirty-four Cup races and won his championship in the first season using the "Chase for the Cup" points format. With a 2006 win in the Busch Series, he became one of only 36 drivers to win races in all three of NASCAR's top divisions: the Cup Series, the Xfinity Series, and the Camping World Truck Series. His early career received significant media attention as his aggressive driving style led to incidents with other competitors, while also having confrontations with his team members and members of the media itself.

In addition to his stock car racing career, Busch has also raced in the Indianapolis 500, the 24 Hours of Daytona, and in the National Hot Rod Association.

Early and personal life

Busch was born to Thomas and Gaye Busch in Las Vegas, Nevada. At the age of six, Busch was accompanying his father to the track and competing in kart racing.  As an underage teenager, he competed in Dwarf competition winning in just his second race, at the Las Vegas Motor Speedway Bullring.  This father and son team competed at western tracks from Southern California to Utah. In 1994, his first full year as a driver, Busch won ten consecutive races at ten different tracks. His father eventually sold their dwarf equipment and purchased a powerful car for the Legends Series, which Busch began driving in 1996 at age 18. After graduating from Durango High School, Busch enrolled at the University of Arizona, hoping to earn a degree in Pharmacy.

Busch became engaged to girlfriend Eva Bryan while attending the 2005 Hungarian Grand Prix. On July 27, 2006, three years to the day of them meeting on a blind date, they were married in Virginia. Busch announced on June 30, 2011, "Those in the NASCAR community have been aware for some time now that we are no longer together and we are legally separated". The announcement came days after Busch kissed another woman in Victory Lane celebration following a win at Sonoma Raceway. In October 2014 at Martinsville, Busch was introduced to polo player Ashley Van Metre by her sister, who was also a friend of Busch. The two eventually began dating, and Busch announced their engagement on August 26, 2015. They were married on January 7, 2017. As of August 2019, Busch and his wife star on CMT's Racing Wives reality TV show. On May 17, 2022 it was announced that Ashley Busch had filed for divorce.

Busch is an avid baseball fan and stated the goal of visiting every ballpark nationwide. As his parents grew up in Chicago, the Chicago Cubs and Chicago Bears are his favorite baseball and American football team, respectively. He is also a Vegas Golden Knights fan.

Before the 2006 season, Busch underwent cosmetic surgery to have his ears pinned back closer to his head.

Busch is a close friend of famous entrepreneur Felix Sabates, who co-owned Chip Ganassi Racing (CGR), and had a successful racing team SABCO Racing. In 2012 when Busch went to drive for Phoenix Racing (a CGR ally), he co-credited Sabates as having helped him convince James Finch to hire him.

Racing career

Beginnings
Busch's first racing experience was in a Dwarf car at age 14 at Pahrump Valley Speedway. He was put in the Dwarf car by his father. Busch also dabbled in IMCA Modified racing.

Busch earned his big break after Chris Trickle was wounded in an unsolved shooting. (Trickle would die of the injuries over a year later.) The Star Nursery team looked for a new driver to replace Trickle for the No. 70 team. Busch gained national exposure while competing against Ron Hornaday Jr., Matt Crafton, Greg Biffle, Kevin Harvick and others for the first time in the 1997 Winter Heat Series at Tucson Raceway Park.

Busch's team went on to win the 1998 NASCAR AutoZone Elite Division, Southwest Series Rookie of the Year. He followed up by winning the series championship in 1999.

That led to a tryout in a Roush Racing "Gong Show", which he won and earned a Craftsman Truck Series ride. He raced the No. 99 Ford F-150. He won four races and finished runner-up to teammate Greg Biffle in the championship standings, as well as winning Rookie of the Year honors.

Cup Series

Roush Racing

2000–2005

Roush Racing announced during the 2000 season that Busch was being promoted to the Winston Cup Series to replace Chad Little in Roush's No. 97 Ford for the 2001 season. Little ended up being released early, and Busch took over the No. 97 John Deere-sponsored Ford at Dover in September 2000. Busch ran seven of the final eight races (Little drove at Talladega) with crew chief Jeff Hammond. Busch's best finish was a 13th-place finish at Charlotte.

Busch began the 2001 season driving an unsponsored car after John Deere pulled out of sponsoring the 97 following the 2000 season. Roush would eventually sign Rubbermaid to a multi-year sponsorship contract later in the year, with its Sharpie marker brand carried as Busch's primary sponsor. scored three Top 5's and six Top 10's that year. During the 2001 Daytona 500, he and Dale Earnhardt made door-to-door contact on lap 85, and Earnhardt responded by giving Busch the finger out of his driver's side window at 185 mph; the Fox Sports replay cameras caught this, leading broadcaster  Mike Joy to remark "Kurt, you're number one." To this day, Busch recalls this as the only time he encountered Earnhardt on the track.

Busch scored his best finish of third at the spring Talladega race, which was three weeks after scoring his first career Top 5 finish at Texas (fourth), and he added a fifth-place in the Brickyard 400 at Indianapolis. He also had some unlucky breaks over the course of the year, especially in the second half where he crashed out of the Southern 500 at Darlington, where he led 74 laps; at Martinsville, where he let 38 laps before cutting a tire in heavy traffic, which ended up causing significant damage to the race car; at Rockingham, where he battled overheating issues despite leading 45 laps; and in the penultimate race at Atlanta, where he failed to qualify. He closed the season with a 21st-place finish at the postponed event at New Hampshire, finishing 27th in points and second behind Kevin Harvick for Cup rookie of the year.

The 2002 season was Busch's breakout year in the Winston Cup Series. He claimed his first victory in the Food City 500 at Bristol, after battling hard with rival Jimmy Spencer on worn tires. Busch added a second win at Martinsville in October and then won at Atlanta the next week and in the season finale at Homestead. This gave Busch four wins, 12 Top 5's, 20 Top 10's, and one pole, all of which would allow him to finish third in the final standings for the year. He finished the season particularly strong, winning three of the final five races and finishing third and sixth, and leading many laps in the next two. As well as his finish in the point standings, he also collected $5,105,394. The 2002 season saw Kurt Busch become the first driver in NASCAR history to win the most races in his first-ever winning season with four. He is one of only two drivers to accomplish this feat, along with Carl Edwards, who did it three years later in 2005.

Busch had an "up and down" year in 2003. He once again recorded four wins, including a season sweep at Bristol, making him the first driver to do that since Rusty Wallace accomplished the feat in 2000). However, inconsistent results later in the season resulted in Busch falling out of the Top 10 in points; he finished in 11th place with nine Top 5's and 14 Top 10's, although he collected over  again that year. Busch was also involved in a bit of NASCAR history during the Carolina Dodge Dealers 400, held at Darlington on March 16 of that year. In the closing laps of the race, he and Ricky Craven were engaged in a tight battle for the lead. Both drivers battled loose race cars as well as each other to the finish. Busch held the lead heading into the final corner but Craven managed to pull almost even exiting turn four. With the finish line approaching both cars made contact and bumped each other repeatedly headed to the checkered flag. When it dropped, Craven had crossed the line .002 seconds before Busch and scored the victory in what was the closest ever finish to a race in NASCAR history.

In 2004, Busch won three races, two poles, and the inaugural NASCAR Nextel Cup Championship, the first year NASCAR held "The Chase for the Championship". He won his fourth consecutive race at Bristol after winning the Food City 500 in March (winning that race for the third consecutive year), and became the second driver to win both races at New Hampshire Motor Speedway in a single season. At Homestead for the final race of the season, Busch nearly lost the championship. On lap 93, Busch entered the access road in turns 3 and 4 that leads to pit road telling his crew that he has a flat right front tire. As Busch came off the access road and was about to enter the pits, the right front wheel, the same one he told his crew was flat even though it wasn't, came off the car. As the wheel came off his car, Kurt darted left and almost hit the yellow barrels on the entrance of pit road. If Busch hit those barrels, his championship would have been lost. The caution came out as the tire rolled down the entire front stretch. Busch fell to third in the standing but was able to get his positions back and won the championship. He scored 10 Top 5's and 21 Top 10's.

In 2005, midway through the season, Busch announced that he would be leaving Roush Racing at the end of the season and would replace Rusty Wallace in the No. 2 Miller Lite-sponsored Dodge for Penske Racing South. Initially, Roush was unhappy with Busch's decision to leave his team but when Chip Ganassi Racing announced that Jamie McMurray wanted to join Roush Racing in 2006, Roush agreed to let Busch go.

Busch won three races during the 2005 season, along with nine Top 5's and 18 Top 10's in 34 races. He also scored an average finish of 15.3. Which all allowed him to finish 10th in the final points standings.

Penske Racing #2

2006–2010

Busch was released from Roush Racing at the end of 2005 and joined Penske Racing South in 2006. Busch had asked team owner Jack Roush to let him out of his contract at the end of 2005, but Roush initially refused. However, after Chip Ganassi released Jamie McMurray from his 2006 contract, Roush decided to release Busch when Roush learned that Busch already signed a contract with Roger Penske before the season ended. Busch's last race with Roush-Fenway Racing and 2005 was at Texas before the final two races; because he was parked by NASCAR for an incident with the police (see below). Busch appealed and a misunderstanding on the police's part was cleared before the races but the parking penalty was held in place.

McMurray, who was originally slated to join Roush in 2007 to drive the No. 6 (which ultimately went to David Ragan), instead replaced Busch in the No. 97, which was then renumbered to No. 26.

In the 2006 season, driving for Penske, Busch scored one win at Bristol Motor Speedway in the Food City 500, his fifth win at the track. Busch celebrated the victory by getting out of his car and making a snow angel on the track, due to snow that had fallen at the track that weekend. He also won six poles and had seven Top 5's and 12 Top 10 finishes but finished 16th in the final standings. He also made his Busch Series debut for Penske in the No. 39 Dodge at Texas Motor Speedway, winning in his first race. He ran six more races that season and picked up a second win at Watkins Glen International by holding off Robby Gordon on the final lap. Gordon and Busch on the final lap struggled for the win but it resulted in Busch holding onto the lead in the outer-loop to seal up the win. In victory circle, Busch thanked Gordon for a fight for victory and said that the struggle reminded him of his 2003 Carolina Dodge Dealers 400 at Darlington when Ricky Craven beat Busch by one inch to win the race after a 2 lap-long struggle to the checkers. Kurt would miss the chase for the first time in 2006 and finished 16th in the points standings.

In the 2007 season, Busch had two wins, one pole, scored five Top 5's, and 10 Top 10's through 26 races, and qualified for the Chase for the Sprint Cup. Busch's on-track performance increased noticeably after the addition of Pat Tryson as his crew chief midway through the season. He also ran four more Busch races, earning 2 top-five and 3 top-ten finishes.

In 2008, to make sure rookie teammate Sam Hornish Jr. would be guaranteed a starting spot in the season's first five races, the owner's points from Busch's No. 2 car were transferred over to the No. 77 car driven by Hornish. Busch would still be guaranteed a starting spot, due to NASCAR's Champion's Provisional Rule, which states that the most recent series champion not in the Top 35 in the previous season's final owner points automatically qualifies for a race. (With his 2004 championship, Busch was by several years the most recent).

At the 2008 Daytona 500, Busch was contending to win and had a fast car on the final lap capable to win. He and his teammate Ryan Newman got by Joe Gibbs Racing rivals, Tony Stewart and Kurt's brother Kyle on the final lap, and Kurt decided to instead of trying for the win himself, push Newman to victory. In turn 4 Newman cleared further challenges and won the race, thanking his win on Busch in the victory circle. It was Roger Penske's first Daytona 500 win and it made Penske one of the few owners to win both the Indianapolis 500 and Daytona 500 in an owner career.

On June 29, 2008, Busch broke a 29-race winless streak at New Hampshire Motor Speedway when the Lenox Industrial Tools 301 was called due to rain on lap 284. It was his first win since Michigan's late summer race in 2007, and his fourth win since joining Penske Racing and 18th overall. Kurt would miss the chase again in 2008 and finished 18th in the points standings.

He began his 2009 season at the 2009 Daytona 500, he was involved in a wreck on lap 124 when Dale Earnhardt Jr. swerved into Brian Vickers. Vickers shot up the track and hit the wall, ricocheting into Denny Hamlin, who came down into Busch. He then spun into the grass along with eight other drivers including his brother Kyle. Busch made numerous pit stops to repair the car and was able to finish tenth. Kurt was one of the many that believed Dale Jr.'s contact was intentional and Kurt joined Earnhardt's fans, the drivers, and owners in calling NASCAR to penalize Earnhardt, for the rest of the race but this was not granted.

Busch then qualified fourth for the season's second race at the Auto Club Speedway in Fontana, California. He ran in the top five most of the race and finished fifth. This moved him up seven spots in the standings to third. Busch led most of the race the 2009 Kobalt Tools 500, leading 235 of 325 laps and getting his nineteenth Sprint Cup Series victory. He led more laps in the race than he did in the entire 2008 season. At Las Vegas, he and his younger brother Kyle had a touching moment when Kyle Busch won at Las Vegas, their hometown. In the victory circle, Kurt came in and shared a big hug with Kyle. Legendary driver and NASCAR announcer Darrell Waltrip called it "The most touching thing I have ever seen."

He remained in the Top 5 in points for the rest of the season. He qualified for the Chase and ended up fourth in the standings, the highest-ranked car that was not under the Hendrick Motorsports banner. Busch picked up another win at the 2009 Dickies 500 after his brother Kyle ran out of fuel with two laps to go.

For the 2010 season, Penske Racing brought rookie, Brad Keselowski on board to drive the No. 12 Penske Racing Dodge Charger. Busch and Sam Hornish would be his teammates. Keselowski also ran a full-time Nationwide Series, driving the No. 22 Dodge Challenger. 2009 Rookie Justin Allgaier accompanied him in the Nationwide Series. Steve Addington, who was Kyle Busch's crew chief for the past two seasons and led the younger Busch to 14 victories, became the crew chief for Kurt at the start of the 2010 season, as Pat Tryson left to join Michael Waltrip Racing as Martin Truex Jr.'s crew chief.

On May 22, 2010, Busch won the 26th Annual NASCAR Sprint All-Star Race. He then followed it up by winning the Coca-Cola 600 the following weekend, becoming only the seventh driver to win both in the same year. Busch eventually made the Chase being seeded fifth in points. Busch also, amazingly, finished seventh at Daytona at the Coke Zero 400 after wrecking three times in the last 12 laps.

Busch would finish out the season 11th among the Chase contenders.

2011: #22 car and final season at Penske

In 2011, Busch and Keselowski swapped teams and crews. Busch took over a renumbered No. 22 Dodge. Busch earned his first Budweiser Shootout win after Denny Hamlin went below the yellow line at the end of the race at Daytona. He would go on to win the 2011 Gatorade Duel 1, and because of polesitter Dale Earnhardt Jr.'s crash in practice, which forced him into a backup car, Busch started in first for the 2011 Daytona 500 and started the 2011 season three for three.

Busch won the pole for and led most of the race at Kansas, for 152 laps. However, a fuel pickup issue late hurt his chances of winning. Teammate Brad Keselowski took the victory. However, a few weeks later on June 26, Kurt finally got an elusive road course victory at Infineon Raceway. Not only did he win, but he also led the most laps with 76. Because of Brad Keselowski's injury during a practice crash at Road Atlanta, Busch filled in for Keselowski in his NASCAR Nationwide Series car for the Zippo 200 at Watkins Glen International, and Busch managed to get the pole and the win. By August 13, 2011, Busch had won 1/4 of all of his Nationwide races. On October 2, Busch won on two late restarts beating Jimmie Johnson in turn 1 leading the final 43 laps to grab his first-ever victory at the Monster Mile at Dover which would end up being his final victory for Penske. After a frustrating final five races, things came to a head when Busch launched a verbal tirade against an ESPN cameraman and gave an obscene gesture to workers when a car blocked his path towards his pit garage following a transmission failure at the same race. Crew chief Steve Addington moved to Stewart-Haas Racing after the 2011 season.

Busch's employment with Penske Racing was terminated on December 5, 2011.  Although most observers of the sport believe he was fired, Busch claimed in a public statement that the parting was "mutual": "I am grateful to Penske Racing for six very productive years. Together we won a lot of races – 16 in all. ... Coming to a mutual agreement to go our separate ways is a positive step for me." In contrast, the Charlotte Observer reported several sources confirming team owner Roger Penske decided that Busch's altercation at Homestead-Miami Speedway was the last straw in his stormy tenure with the team but chose to defer the announcement until after Champion's Week. He was replaced in the No. 22 by A. J. Allmendinger. Kurt Busch later said that the dismissal was mostly because, following his engine blow-up in Homestead, he was frustrated that the No. 22 team was unable to compete for championships, and he and Penske couldn't agree on whether the problem was the car or the driver. However, Busch also said that he maintains a friendship with Penske.

Phoenix Racing

2012: First winless season

Following his release from Penske Racing, Busch realized that he wasn't "having fun" anymore and, next to going to therapy for his anger problems, wanted to "put the fun back into racing." As a result, Busch declined an offer from Richard Petty Motorsports in favor of an early-season agreement to drive for Phoenix Racing, in the No. 51 Chevrolet, for the 2012 Sprint Cup Series season. He also talked to Michael Waltrip Racing, Furniture Row Racing and Richard Childress Racing to see if any rides were available at those teams. He also ran a limited Nationwide Series schedule for the team. At the same time, Busch formed a sponsorship relationship with Monster Energy Drink in which he signed a deal with Kyle Busch Motorsports, to share the No. 54 car with his younger brother in the Nationwide Series.

At the 2012 Aaron's 499 at Talladega, Busch paid homage to the 2006 racing comedy Talladega Nights: The Ballad of Ricky Bobby by running his No. 51 car with the paint scheme of Ricky Bobby's No. 62 "ME" Cougar car from the movie, causing NASCAR on Fox commentators Mike Joy, Larry McReynolds and Darrell Waltrip to jokingly refer to Busch as "Ricky Bobby" throughout the race, and Busch also dropped movie lines into radio chatter with his spotter and crew chief. Busch's girlfriend Patricia Driscoll spent months getting permission from Sony and Will Ferrell as well as other trademark and license holders. Busch's real-life fall from grace during the 2011–12 Sprint Cup offseason has been compared to Ricky Bobby's. Busch's car was one of the stronger performers, running near the front and leading for a few laps. Towards the end of the race, with six laps to go, he dropped back when he spun out in the trioval off ex-teammate Brad Keselowski's bumper. After stopping, Busch drove backward down pit road to get replacement tires, though he was not penalized and finished in 20th place as the last car on the lead lap.

At Darlington, Busch was turned with Ryan Newman, and both drivers' days were ended. Busch was fined $50,000 and put on a five-race probation and Newman was not penalized. Busch would finish the race in 21st, the last car on the lead lap.

On June 4, 2012, Busch feuded with Justin Allgaier at the Nationwide event at Dover and after talking to his boss and brother Kyle. When asked by Bob Pockrass about being on probation, Busch said, "It refrains me from not beating the shit out of you right now because you ask me stupid questions. But since I'm on probation, I suppose that's improper to say as well. If you can talk about racing things, we'll talk about many things, Bob. It is not racing, you're here just to start stuff, you know that's you're all out here for!" NASCAR immediately suspended Busch from the Pocono race as a result of violating their policy forbidding swearing publicly.

The following week NASCAR suspended Busch until June 13, 2012, and extended his probation until December 31. Busch was already on probation for the confrontation with Newman and his crew following the May 12, 2012, Sprint Cup race at Darlington and for driving recklessly through Newman's pit stall.

According to a NASCAR news release, Busch was suspended for violating Section 12-1 of the NASCAR rulebook, which covers "actions detrimental to stock car racing; violation of probation; verbal abuse to a media member."

On July 6, 2012, Busch won the Nationwide Series Jalapeño 250 at Daytona by passing Austin Dillon on the final lap.

During his 7–8-month stint with James Finch, he finished third at Sonoma after leading a few laps and running in the top three all race long. However, his nearest miss took place at Talladega that autumn. There Busch controlled the race early and mid-way and spun out from contact with Jamie McMurray. He was parked by NASCAR after driving away from the safety officials who were trying to assist him and he would not stop his car even though NASCAR was telling him to do so. The following week he began driving for Furniture Row Racing. Kurt would miss the Chase for the first time since 2008 and finished a dismal 25th in the points standings.

Furniture Row Racing

2012
On September 24, 2012, it was announced that Busch would drive the No. 78 Chevrolet SS for Furniture Row Racing for the 2013 season, replacing Regan Smith. The connection started when then-crew chief Todd Berrier called Busch to gauge his interest in driving for FRR.

In his first start for FRR at the 2012 Bank of America 500, Busch finished 21st. He had a 25th-place finish the following week at Kansas. Busch later rebounded with three consecutive Top 10 finishes at Texas, Phoenix, and Homestead to end the season.

2013: Return to The Chase

2013 started for Busch the very same way that 2012 had – driving with a new team, in this case, Furniture Row Racing. Despite this, Busch showed off significant improvement over the off-year that had been 2012, both for himself and FRR as a whole: in the three years the car was driven by Regan Smith, Furniture Row Racing had only one win, three top-five, and six top-ten finishes, and only led 42 laps in Sprint Cup competition. In comparison, in the first 23 races of 2013, Busch had five top-five finishes, nine top-ten finishes, one pole, and had led 270 laps, more than six times as many laps as the car had ever led with Smith in the previous three seasons.

Busch started the 2013 season crashing in the Sprint Unlimited on lap 14, finishing in 13th place. He finished fifth in the Budweiser Duel, but poor handling made him finish the Daytona 500 in 28th place, five laps down. He did not improve much the next week at Phoenix, where he finished one lap down in twenty-seventh place. He then had a twentieth-place finish at Las Vegas. After three less successful runs, he hit a resurgence, getting a fourth-place finish at Bristol.

At Fontana, Busch went a lap down briefly after being penalized for speeding during green-flag pit stops, but he surged back in the last laps to finish in third place behind his brother Kyle Busch and Dale Earnhardt Jr.

At Martinsville, Busch had bad luck. He crashed early in the race and after repairing his damages, successfully took the lucky dog free pass. But later, on lap 487, while running many laps down, Busch lost his brakes in turn 1 and slammed the wall hard enough to cause his engine to burst into flames. This brought out a 6-minute red flag. Busch was uninjured.

At Texas, Busch almost acquired the pole position with a qualifying speed of 195.688 mph, but the final one to qualify; his younger brother managed to win the pole with a speed of 196.299 mph to conclude qualifying. Busch ended up starting second, but still on the front row. However, he was disappointed to lose the pole, saying "I would rather lose to Kyle than anybody else... it is frustrating that I do lose it to him though."

At Richmond, Busch led for 36 laps and contended for victory. However, on a final restart, he again tangled with Tony Stewart. He had bumped Stewart on the restart causing Stewart to finish out of the top-ten. After the race ended the two cars exchanged shoves and the two argued on pit road, drawing attention away from the race winner Kevin Harvick. Both were summoned to the NASCAR hauler. Busch finished in ninth place and said to reporters that he did not intentionally hit Stewart and said he was surprised and disappointed when Stewart retaliated after the checkers.

At Talladega, Busch led two laps and was in the top-ten on lap 182 when he was collected in a large pileup on the back straightaway. He took the worst damage in the crash, as J. J. Yeley got loose from contact with Ricky Stenhouse Jr., went across the track, and hit him with enough force that Busch turned sideways, flipped over once, and landed on top of Ryan Newman, then slid off Newman and struck the outside wall, and was hit again by Clint Bowyer and Bobby Labonte. Busch was uninjured.

At Darlington, Busch won his first pole position of the year. From the drop of the green flag, Busch led 69 of the first 80 laps, but his handling went away after the first green flag pit stops and he was forced to settle for a fourteenth-place finish.

At the All-Star race, Busch started up front and led 29 laps, winning two of the four 20 lap segments, with brother Kyle winning the other two. However, a poor pit stop by both Busch brothers was responsible for causing them to lose the lead and race to Jimmie Johnson for the final ten-lap shootout. Kurt finished fifth.

At the Coca-Cola 600 a week later, Busch started second on the outside of the front row. Despite having to change a battery late in the race, he led eight laps and he still finished in third place, the first time he'd finished in the top three since June 2012 at Sonoma. When interviewed, he responded, "Yeah, a top-five is great. To be up front, to lead laps, that's what it's all about. So we'll get these little hiccups polished up and continue plugging forward. That's the only thing we can do, is learn from what exactly happened – was it a cable issue, a battery that was dead, was the alternator not charging? To show our strength tonight, to finish third, we'll take it. I think that's what needs to be said. The Furniture Row team was fast, and we didn't quite have a perfect night, and we brought it home third."

Busch then had a 12th-place finish at Dover and a seventh-place showing at Pocono. At Michigan, Busch qualified on the front row and led the first 21 laps, but went seven laps down when he got into an early accident on lap 30.

At Sonoma, Busch got his next top-five finish with a fourth-place finish, after leading fifteen laps, then battling back from a lap down after a pair of speeding penalties on pit road.

At Kentucky, brief controversy hit Busch as on lap 48, he was responsible for causing a seven-car wreck that was instigated when he went down on the apron, then came back up the track and turned Brad Keselowski approaching turn 1, causing Keselowski to shoot up the track and collect several more cars including Greg Biffle, Travis Kvapil and Dave Blaney. Busch finished sixth and followed this up with another sixth-place finish at the Coke Zero 400. This finish gave Furniture Row Racing their first-ever streak of three straight top-ten finishes, and also moved Busch up to ninth in the points. However the next week at Loudon, Busch started second and led 102 laps before he was turned and wrecked by Matt Kenseth and finished 31st.

At Indianapolis, Busch had a fourteenth place showing. The following week at Pocono, he led nine laps and recorded a third-place finish. This was followed by a ninth-place finish at Watkins Glen. Returning to Michigan, Busch started on the outside of the front row, led 43 laps, and finished third, bringing himself up to ninth in driver points.

At Bristol in August, Busch started on the outside row and led 54 laps early, before a loose wheel caused him to go behind the wall, resulting in a 31st-place finish, 26 laps down. However, he bounced back over the following two weeks, with a fourth-place finish at Atlanta. The following week at Richmond, Busch started second and had one of the strongest cars of the night, ultimately finishing second to Carl Edwards. This also marked Furniture Row Racing's first-ever appearance in the Chase.

At Chicagoland, Busch opened the Chase with a fourth-place finish. He then had a 13th-place finish at New Hampshire. At Dover, Busch finished 21st, three laps down, after he had to pit for a loose wheel. At Kansas, Busch was forced to start at the rear of the field when he crashed in practice and had to bring out a backup car. He managed to work his way through the field to finish second. This brought Busch up to ten top-five and fifteen top-ten finishes over 30 races. Busch would go on to finish tenth in the final standings.

Also in 2013, Busch planned to drive the No. 1 Chevrolet in the Nationwide Series for Phoenix Racing, competing in sixteen events; in the event he would run only three races during the season, wrecking at Daytona but having top-ten finishes at Talladega and the second race at Daytona.

Stewart-Haas Racing
On August 26, 2013, Busch announced that he would be leaving Furniture Row Racing to join Stewart-Haas Racing, stating he had signed a multi-year deal with the team. Team co-owner Gene Haas stated he would fund Busch's ride exclusively. In late September it was revealed that Busch's car number would be the No. 41.

2014: Return to Victory Lane

Busch had his outbreaking race for his new team at Fontana. He led a bit of the race after Jimmie Johnson blew a tire with 7 laps to go. He led on the restart against teammate Tony Stewart but lost the lead on the final lap after allowing Kyle Busch to slip past and win.

The next week at the STP 500, on lap 43, Busch collided with Brad Keselowski on pit road during a caution, causing massive damage to Keselowski's car. There would be several instances of beating and banging between the two drivers after Keselowski's car was repaired and came out of the garage. By the end of the race, Busch was battling Jimmie Johnson for the lead in the final 27 laps. Busch took the lead with 11 laps remaining, and kept it to win his first race since 2011, and first at Martinsville since 2002.

At Darlington, while running in the top five with 3 laps to go, Busch got tapped from behind by Clint Bowyer and spun out, hitting a barrier head-on. Because of energy-absorbing walls, Busch was uninjured, but waved angrily towards Bowyer under caution and showed discontent with Bowyer in post-race ceremonies. In regards to the incident with Bowyer, Busch said "That was a terrible way to end what could have been a decent night. We struggled at times to get the balance of the Haas Automation Chevrolet right, but we kind of found our spot just past the halfway point and made slight adjustments the rest of the way. We called for a two-tire stop at the end hoping to gain some track position, but it seemed like everyone had the same idea. We gained a little, but the guys behind us all had four tires. I tried to hold them off the best I could, but someone (Bowyer) moved me out of their way and it ruined our night. I hate it for the team, but we keep learning each week and we will get better."

At the Coca-Cola 600, Busch in his attempt to complete all 1,100 miles of the 2014 Indianapolis 500 and the Coca-Cola 600 in the same day, came up 194 miles short, blowing an engine on lap 274 after completing 271 of the 400 laps. 

At Pocono, Busch qualified third. He led 5 laps throughout the race and ran in the top five all day long. He ultimately finished third; his best finish since his win at Martinsville.

At Daytona Busch qualified 42nd; despite this Busch led the most laps. However, he got passed by Aric Almirola on lap 111. 5 laps later a rain-shower soaked the speedway on lap 116 ending the race. In an interview, a disappointed Busch said "I didn't do my job. Third is good but I wanted to win." After the race, Busch was penalized 10 points and Daniel Knost was fined $10,000 for an illegal window automotive part accidentally installed before the race. Busch elected not to appeal the penalty.

After Daytona, Busch did much better. He had a top-five finish at Pocono and Watkins Glen. Daniel Knost parted ways with Kurt Busch mid-way into the Chase and Knost was replaced with Tony Gibson. Knost was given to Busch's teammate Danica Patrick. With Gibson as his new crew chief, Kurt did significantly better, qualifying his remaining races in the top ten. His best finish in a race during the Chase was seventh twice-at Talladega and Phoenix. During the NASCAR off-season, Busch had a widely publicized falling-out with his longtime girlfriend Patricia Driscoll, that led to acrimony and near-charges against Busch (see below).

2015

Busch started his season on a rough note in the 2015 Sprint Unlimited when he got collected in 2 multi-car accidents. At the second Budweiser Duel, he was running second behind Jimmie Johnson with nine laps to go. He went below the yellow line by accident and improved his spot. He was given a stop-and-go-penalty by officials which sent him to the back of the field for the final results.

On February 20, 2015, Busch was indefinitely suspended by NASCAR after a Delaware family court cited "more likely than not" that Busch had abused his ex-girlfriend Patricia Driscoll. The accusation came after the couple split up and she came to the Dover track and let herself into his motor coach without permission using Busch's entrance code. Regan Smith replaced him for the Daytona 500 along with the races held at Atlanta and Las Vegas. Kurt Busch applied for reinstatement ten days after the Daytona 500 and began his reinstatement program.

On March 11, 2015, NASCAR lifted Busch's indefinite suspension after prosecutors in Delaware determined there was not enough evidence to bring a criminal case against Busch, making him eligible to compete again, starting with the CampingWorld.com 500 at Phoenix. Driscoll is now under federal indictment for fraud and misusing charitable donations for personal gain. Additionally, Busch was granted a waiver by NASCAR, making him still eligible for the Chase if he won a race between then and the autumn Richmond event. In his first race back from suspension, Busch finished fifth. At Auto Club, Busch won the pole and led the most laps (65), before being bumped back to third due to a last-lap pass by Brad Keselowski and Kevin Harvick. The race ended in controversy as, according to an online poll, 69% of the fans suspected a fix in the waning laps on NASCAR's part. NASCAR denied the allegations but not before the controversy broke out for the next few days following the race.

The next week at Martinsville, Busch led early in the race. He faded to the tail end of the field mid-way. He briefly got penalized for moving lanes before the restart, but 20 laps later officials rescinded the penalty.

Busch later took the checkers after a dominating performance at Richmond. Battling Jamie McMurray for the win during the final 100 laps, Busch pulled away to win the race, his first win of the season.

Busch's second win came in a rain-shortened Michigan race. At Sonoma, Busch dominated early, before finishing second to younger brother Kyle.

Busch would finish 8th in 2015 championship points despite missing the first three races of the season, scoring 21 top 10s and 3 poles.

2016

Busch started the 2016 season bringing home a 10th-place finish in the Daytona 500 and winning two consecutive poles for Atlanta and Las Vegas. However, he was given the pole position for the former at Atlanta because his brother, Kyle Busch, earned that spot in qualifying but started dead-last after his time was disallowed due to failing post-qualifying inspection. He got his first and only victory of the season at Pocono, ironically the only race of the season when his crew chief Tony Gibson was suspended. Busch had a very consistent season, breaking a record for most consecutive lead-lap finishes to start the year. His streak ended, however, when he got his first DNF of the season during the 23rd race at Bristol after suffering contact from Joey Logano. He remained in the top ten in points throughout the year and finished 7th in the championship standings.

2017: Daytona 500 Win

Stewart-Haas Racing switched to Ford for the 2017 season, a manufacturer who had not won a Cup championship since Busch's 2004 campaign with Roush.

Busch started off 2017 with a crash in the Advance Auto Parts Clash after Jimmie Johnson got loose and spun, collecting Busch. A week later, Busch won the Daytona 500, passing Kyle Larson on the last lap. Busch struggled throughout the rest of the year, obtaining a 14th place in the standings with 6 Top-5s, 14 Top-10s and 7 DNFs.

2018: Final season at Stewart-Haas 
In the summer of 2017, Busch and Stewart-Haas Racing were visibly struggling to re-sign Busch as it was announced that SHR had not "picked up the option" to re-sign Kurt. Despite this, Busch and SHR signed a one-year deal for him to continue driving their No. 41 Ford in 2018. Busch started the 2018 season with the pole at Texas. He repeated this at Michigan and New Hampshire. Busch would get his only win of the season in the night race at Bristol, snapping a 58-race winless streak and locking him in the 2018 Playoffs. His consistency had advanced him as far as the Round of 8 of the Playoffs before he was eliminated at Phoenix due to a late crash with Denny Hamlin and Chase Elliott. Busch finished the season seventh in the points standings. On December 2, 2018, Busch announced that he will not return to Stewart-Haas Racing in 2019.

Chip Ganassi Racing

2019

On December 4, 2018, it was confirmed that Busch and sponsor Monster Energy will move to the Chip Ganassi Racing No. 1 Chevrolet Camaro ZL1 in the 2019 season. As he signed a one-year deal with the team, it was believed that this would have been his final full-time season in NASCAR competition.

At the Pennzoil 400, Busch's No. 1 car had sponsorship from Star Nursery, and the car's livery was based on Busch's first NASCAR victory in the AutoZone Elite Division. Busch scored his first win with CGR at Kentucky, beating his brother Kyle on the final restart. It was the third time the Busch brothers finished 1–2, but the first time Kurt emerged the victor. Despite making the playoffs, Busch was eliminated in the Round of 16 after finishing 20th at the Charlotte Roval. On November 2, 2019, CGR officially announced that Busch has signed on with the No. 1 team for at least two more years.

2020
Busch managed to make the 2020 playoffs without winning a race by staying consistent with four top-fives and 14 top-10 finishes. He scored his 32nd career win and his first of 2020 at Las Vegas; the win secured him a spot in the Round of 8.

2021

Busch started 2021 with 1 top-five and 2 top-10 finishes in the first three races, however, his results dropped off; he would not finish in the top-10 again until the 16th race at Sonoma. He finished 6th and sparked a run of three consecutive top-eight finishes. On June 30, 2021, Justin Marks, co-founder of Trackhouse Racing Team announced that he had purchased Chip Ganassi Racing's entire NASCAR operations after the 2021 season, which left Busch as a free agent. On July 11, Kurt held off younger brother Kyle to win the Quaker State 400 at Atlanta, locking himself into the playoffs. Busch was eliminated from the playoffs following the conclusion of the Round of 16 at Bristol. He finished the season 11th in the points standings.

23XI Racing

2022

On August 27, 2021, it was revealed that Busch will pilot the No. 45 Toyota Camry for 23XI Racing in 2022. Busch began his 2022 season with a 19th-place finish at the 2022 Daytona 500. Despite a promising start with top-five finishes at Phoenix and Atlanta, he suffered from poor finishes at COTA, Richmond, Bristol dirt, Dover, and Darlington. However, he rebounded with a win at Kansas. At the Pocono race, Busch was not medically cleared after a crash during qualifying, and subsequently missed the last five races of the regular season. Xfinity Series driver Ty Gibbs substituted for Busch during his recovery from symptoms of a concussion. On August 25, Busch announced he withdrew his request for a playoff waiver, marking the first time since 2012 that he missed the playoffs. On October 16, he announced he would step away from full-time competition in 2023, with the possibility of running the season on a part-time basis.

NHRA
Busch began training in January 2011 under veteran NHRA Pro Stock driver Allen Johnson and obtained his NHRA Pro Stock competition license. He made his drag racing competition debut on March 10 at the 42nd annual Tire Kingdom Gatornationals in Gainesville. On March 12, 2011, Busch qualified in the Pro Stock field and made his first professional drag racing Elimination-round start on March 13, 2011, losing to Erica Enders by 0.004 seconds. Busch is only the fourth driver to cross over between NASCAR and NHRA, the other three being Tony Stewart, Richard Petty and John Andretti.

Open-wheel racing
In 2003, during CART's pre-season test at Sebring International Raceway, Busch tested a Champ Car for three-time CART champion Bobby Rahal. Ford, Busch's manufacturer in Winston Cup at the time, was CART's exclusive engine supplier, and the test was merely for fun rather than evaluation. Driving a car fielded for Michel Jourdain Jr. (who later tried NASCAR), Busch was pleased with the experience, though he was several seconds off pacesetter Oriol Servia's time.

In 2013 it was announced that Busch would test an IndyCar for Andretti Autosport, owned by 1991 CART champion Michael Andretti, at the Indianapolis Motor Speedway. Andretti, the defending championship team, used Chevrolet engines, as Busch's Furniture Row Racing team does in Sprint Cup. Busch did not comment on whether or not he was preparing for Indianapolis 500. In January 2014 he insisted that he is interested in competing at the Indianapolis 500.

It was announced on March 4, 2014, that Busch would attempt to qualify for the 2014 Indianapolis 500, driving a fifth car for the Andretti Autosport team, and attempt to perform double duty: racing in both the Indianapolis 500 and the Coca-Cola 600 on the same day.

Busch started 12th in the Indy 500. After riding along throughout the race, Busch became more competitive. He finished sixth and received praise from his fellow NASCAR racers for his finish. However, his attempt to do the full 1,100 miles of both races ended 191 miles short when the engine on his Charlotte car blew on lap 273.

Other racing
On October 21, 2014, Busch announced he would race in the 2014 Race of Champions for Team USA alongside IndyCar's Ryan Hunter-Reay. He also competed alongside his brother Kyle Busch in the 2017 Race of Champions for Team USA NASCAR, ultimately losing to Team Germany's Sebastian Vettel in the final round of the Nations' Cup.

Controversies

2005 Phoenix DUI
Busch's 2005 season ended two races short after a confrontation during the fall Phoenix race weekend with Maricopa County Sheriff deputies on November 11, 2005, when he was pulled over for suspicion of drunken driving and cited for reckless driving. At first, the Sheriff's department claimed that their equipment for sobriety testing had failed and they could not release results of his drunk driving tests. This claim later proved to be false, but by this time, Roush Racing responded two days later by suspending Busch for the remainder of the season and replacing him with Kenny Wallace for the final two races. Team president Geoff Smith famously declared they were "officially retiring as Kurt Busch's apologists." Busch was eighth in the Cup Series Chase for the Championship at the time of the incident. He was ordered to undergo 50 hours of community service which was to be completed within one year. In November 2006, one year after the incident, Busch was declared an honorary deputy in Maricopa County.

2007 All-Star Challenge incident
At the 2007 NEXTEL All-Star Challenge, Busch had a public breakdown of relations with his younger brother Kyle. With ten laps to go in the race, the Busches were racing against each other, their cars made contact; eventually, their contact resulted in the two crashing out of contention to win. Kevin Harvick went by to win the race; but the center of the attention and media was on Kurt and Kyle's feud. Kyle and Kurt were livid with each other in the post-race ceremonies, and were arguing on the pit road. When Kurt was interviewed he stated he "wasn't going to be eating any Kellogg's [Kyle's sponsor] soon", and said that Kyle was fighting dirty. When Kyle was interviewed he said that he wanted to cleanly get by Kurt and that Kurt shoved up his car for no reason. The next week, when they refused to reconcile, NASCAR had officials separate them for the rest of the season to avoid any further on-track or off-track incidents. The two brothers did not speak to each other for six months; it was not until a family Thanksgiving reunion, by the persuasion of their grandmother, Kurt and Kyle apologized to each other.

Later on during an interview with Graham Bensinger on his show In Depth with Graham Bensinger in February 2021, Kyle said of the incidentHe (Kurt) wrecked me. Finally admitted it on my 200th win party, I called him out on it and he admitted it. All I wanted you to do was admit that you wrecked me.

2011 Richmond races
During the Crown Royal 400 at Richmond International Raceway, Busch went on a profanity-laced tirade on his in-car radio that appeared to be directed at then Penske racing technical director Tom German. Busch was reportedly dissatisfied with German and at one point during the race said "I'm sorry, our day was done when Tom German decided he was in charge".

During the September 10, 2011 Wonderful Pistachios 400 at Richmond International Raceway, Busch locked up his brakes and accidentally wrecked Jimmie Johnson on lap 186. Despite Busch's pleas that he did not intend to crash Johnson, Johnson did not see it that way, and later retaliated spinning Busch going into Turn 1 sixty laps later and was disqualified for the rest of the race. Busch ended up in fifth place and called Johnson "A five-time chump-ion."

In the post-race interview, Busch was quoted as saying on ABC that he was "in [Johnson's] head,". He had to be restrained after the race when NASCAR.com reporter Joe Menzer asked “Kurt, can either you or Jimmie win the Chase...”. Busch cut Menzer off replying “How did I see you were going to come with that? We’re good.” and started to walk away. Busch ultimately shouted expletives and physically went after Menzer before Penske team members had to physically restrain him. Jenna Fryer later in a press conference asked Johnson about the comment during the ABC post-race interview, Busch interrupted saying "I didn't say that tonight. Did not." Fryer offered to show him the ABC transcript, which he looked at after the interview. Busch proceeded to tear up the transcript showing he had made these statements and walked out of the media center.

2011 Loudon
At the start of the Sylvania 300 at New Hampshire Motor Speedway, Busch's team was delayed in rolling their car to pit road until after the national anthem. During pre-race car inspections, NASCAR had an issue with the rear-end housing being outside of its allowable tolerances. Jamie Little, walking with Busch, asked if he was OK with her asking a question. Busch responded, "Why the fuck do you think I would be OK? I gotta go get in my car. NASCAR told me I gotta get in my car."

2011 Homestead-Miami
In the final race of the 2011 season, Busch finished 47 laps behind the leaders, after spending time in the garage when his transmission failed on just the third lap of the race.  While turning into the garage, Busch made an obscene hand gesture. While his car was undergoing repairs, Busch verbally abused Dr. Jerry Punch while waiting to be interviewed by Punch for ESPN, in an incident captured by a fan and posted on YouTube. NASCAR fined Busch $50,000 for his actions during the race, and Penske Racing issued an apology for Busch's "inappropriate actions".

During the 2011 NASCAR Championship week, Busch revealed that he had been working with a sports psychologist for two months, to work on "personal issues", acknowledging "I need to be a better person on the radio, to the team, as a leader. It's personal issues, of course, and working with a sports psychologist, I've gotten obviously a small grasp, but there are obviously bigger things that I need to accomplish and things can't happen overnight".

Penske Racing and Busch later mutually agreed to part ways, although many in the sport believe he was fired. Kurt Busch would later say in a 2019 podcast interview with Michael Waltrip that the situation began with his battle with another competitor to finish in the top-ten in the standings (Busch would finish 11th in points). On lap 3, when Busch's transmission failed, a sharp piece of engine equipment shot into the car's dashboard, almost injuring Busch. Busch's dismissal was mostly because he felt frustrated that the No. 22 team was unable to compete for championships, and he and team owner Roger Penske couldn't agree on whether the problem was the car or the driver. However, Busch also said in the podcast that he is still friends with Penske.

2012 Darlington confrontation with Ryan Newman
With six laps remaining in the Bojangles' Southern 500, Busch cut a tire and subsequently caused a wreck that involved not only his car but also Ryan Newman. When leaving his pit (directly in front of Newman), Busch did a burnout and sped next to where crew members and NASCAR officials were standing. Following the conclusion of the race, while entering pit road, Busch bumped Newman's car. Busch explained the incident as an accident and unrelated, caused by taking his helmet off and not seeing where he was going. Andrew Rueger, Newman's gas man, went after Busch following the race. This turned into a heated argument, accidentally knocking over a NASCAR official. Newman, giving an interview to Sports Illustrated, was quoted as saying, "It's easy to say that Kurt blew a fuse again, I'm not sure why he did it and tried to run over our guys and NASCAR officials. And nobody is. I think the chemical imbalance speaks for itself. Kurt drilled me in pit lane and said that he was taking his helmet off, and he didn't see where he was going. I'm pretty sure there were 42 other guys that are taking their helmets off and doing whatever for the last 10 years, and that's the first time that's happened to me." On May 15, 2012, NASCAR announced that Busch had been fined $50,000 and placed on probation until July 25, 2012, for "reckless driving on pit road during the race" and for being "involved in an altercation with another competitor after the completion of the race" and Newman was not penalized.

2012 Dover Nationwide race
After the 2012 5-hour Energy 200, Busch, who was already on probation after the altercation with Newman at Darlington, was upset with Justin Allgaier after a close call during the race. After the race, Bob Pockrass, a reporter with the Sporting News, asked Busch if being on probation made an impact during the Nationwide Series race. Busch replied "It refrains me from not beating the shit out of you right now because you ask me stupid questions. But since I'm on probation, I suppose that's improper to say as well." On June 4, NASCAR suspended Busch for both the upcoming tire test and the Pocono 400 at Pocono Raceway, and extended his probation though December 31, 2012. For this race, Busch's car was driven by David Reutimann, who finished in 21st place on the lead lap.

2012 Talladega
Busch's No. 51 was parked by NASCAR on lap 99 of the 2012 Good Sam Roadside Assistance 500 after Busch drove away from track workers that were tending to his car, which had run out of gas and crashed on the back straightaway after being accidentally spun out by Jamie McMurray. He had been leading the race before the accident and soon the medical assistance arrived. Busch exited the car but realized that his fuel tank was not empty and attempted to drive the car to the garage for repairs. As a medical bag was dragged with the car and slipped off NASCAR ordered Kurt to stop his car for medical assistance but because Busch did not put his helmet back on after he exited the car he was unable to hear any orders over the radio. His car ran out of gas just in turn 4 and NASCAR officials picked him up and parked the No. 51 team for the remainder of the race. Busch said goodbye to his team members since he was to drive the No. 78 car for a multi-year deal after the race and when asked about the incident, Busch said that he ignored the order because he did not have his helmet on and could not hear his crew chief's order to stop. NASCAR investigation that week proved that this appeal was true, and therefore, they did not penalize Busch any further after the parking.

Domestic violence allegations and suspension
On February 20, 2015, Busch became the first driver suspended for allegations of domestic violence under NASCAR's personal conduct policy due to his being investigated on allegations that he had assaulted his ex-girlfriend Patricia Driscoll during the Dover race weekend in September 2014. As a result, he was suspended and replaced by Regan Smith in the Daytona 500 and the next two races after that. Even though charges were never issued, NASCAR head Brian France announced that he would remain suspended until he completed NASCAR's reinstatement program.

On March 11, 2015, the indefinite suspension was lifted by NASCAR after Busch completed all requirements of their reinstatement program. Kurt went on to make the Chase and win 2 races that season.

Feuds with rival drivers
In the February 2006 edition of GQ Magazine, he was selected number three on their list of the top ten most hated athletes, behind Barry Bonds and Terrell Owens.

During his early career, Busch was notable for having been a rival to Jimmy Spencer. In 2002, at Bristol, Spencer was leading with 150 laps left in the race. With 56 laps to go, Busch came up to Spencer's No. 41 Dodge. After a small bump, Spencer slowed and Busch got by. Busch led the rest of the race and took his first Cup win. As Spencer finished the race, he radioed, "We will never forget what happened today, guys," regarding the contact. In a post-race interview, Busch claimed it was payback for a past move at Phoenix in late 2001 in which Spencer wrecked him trying to make a pass. Spencer threateningly warned, "Jimmy never forgets."

At Indianapolis later in summer 2002, Busch was racing in the top ten. He passed Spencer on lap 37. In reply, Spencer deliberately tapped Busch, who then crashed into the turn 3 wall. Busch climbed out of his demolished car, and, until paramedics came, whenever he saw Spencer driving by him under caution, he pointed at Spencer and repeatedly shouted at him. When interviewed Kurt called Jimmy Spencer a "decrepit old has-been [...] or I guess he's a never-was." Spencer replied "Kurt has a lot to learn, and some of that is to control his mouth".

In summer 2003, at Michigan, Busch and Spencer had another incident. After Spencer and Busch made contact on the track, Spencer was livid. When the race ended, Spencer saw Busch driving by him in the garage. Spencer reportedly went into Busch's window and punched Busch in the face. Spencer was led away, and Busch was taken to a hospital with a bloody nose and a dental injury. For this, NASCAR and Ultra Motorsports had Spencer parked for the Cup race at Bristol the next weekend. The week before the race, Spencer also was fined $35,000 and put on probation for the rest of the year. Spencer was nearly arrested on assault charges until NASCAR promised to handle it. Since then, Spencer and Busch did not get involved with each other anymore on the track. In 2013, Busch and Spencer announced that they are now close friends and no longer have grudges against each other.

At Charlotte, in the 2002 running of the Winston, Busch was involved in an altercation with Robby Gordon. In the final segment of the race, Busch tapped Gordon's No. 31 Chevy, throwing him into the wall. After the race, Busch admitted that he intentionally spun Gordon to "put on a good show," and added that he "hated to use Robby as a caution." Kurt was fined $10,000 by NASCAR for the incident and put on probation until the end of the calendar year.

Aside from Spencer and Gordon, Busch has had notable run-ins with Greg Biffle, Brad Keselowski, Jimmie Johnson, teammates Kevin Harvick and Tony Stewart, and even with younger brother Kyle, for whom he raced in the Nationwide Series in 2012.

On June 4, 2007, in the Autism Speaks 400 at Dover International Speedway, after a tangle with Stewart on lap 264, Busch drove up beside Stewart's car on pit road and gestured through his window netting, causing a pit crew member to jump over Stewart's hood to avoid being hit. Busch was parked for the rest of the race, penalized 100 championship points, fined $100,000, and placed on probation until the end of the year.

Busch would spar with Stewart again the following season. During practice for the 2008 Budweiser Shootout at Daytona, Stewart clipped the back end of Busch's car and sent Busch into the wall. After sustaining major damage, Busch drove towards Stewart's car and rammed Stewart's car three times before attempting to return to the garage after the practice was called. Stewart had stopped his car to block Busch from going back into the garage area, but Busch went around Stewart.

In 2013, Busch and Stewart had yet another altercation at Richmond. On a final restart, Busch drove by Stewart, who afterward got loose and lost 15 positions. After the race ended with Busch in ninth, Stewart made contact with Busch to express displeasure and another bump ruined Kurt's car. While Harvick was celebrating in victory lane, Stewart and Busch began arguing, which turned the fans' attention to the argument rather than Harvick's win. Busch said that he was just racing Stewart cleanly on the final lap and was satisfied with his good run for his new Furniture Row team. The following season, Busch was hired to drive for the team Stewart owns.

Busch also has a bitter history with Kevin Harvick. They raced each other at carnivals and go-kart tracks as teenagers and sparred many times starting in 2001. Their feud came to a boiling point in spring 2006. At Bristol in 2006, Harvick spent the drivers' meeting and his pre-race interview taunting Busch following a feud at Atlanta. Busch ignored his insults and won the race, while Harvick ended up in second place. When Harvick was interviewed after the race ended he said that he was happy with his finish but said he was very upset to see Busch win, before calling Busch a "whiner." Richard Childress later apologized for his driver's comments and NASCAR gave Harvick a warning not to target Busch. In 2007 when Harvick won two races Busch dominated such as the 2007 Daytona 500, and the 2007 All-Star Race, Busch said the same thing about Harvick: "I just hate losing to Kevin." Ironically, in 2014, with both drivers moving from their previous teams to Stewart-Haas Racing, Busch and Harvick became teammates with Stewart.

On June 21, 2009, in the Toyota/Save Mart 350, Busch was involved in a wreck with Jimmie Johnson. Three weeks later, at Chicagoland Speedway, both Johnson and Busch were involved in another incident where they collided with each other. Busch then retaliated by colliding with Johnson's car in the door area shortly after the contact. Over a year later, Busch was involved in a crash on lap 165 at Pocono's August race after bump drafting with Johnson. His part was overshadowed by Elliott Sadler's violent hit into the inside wall in the same crash. Busch and Johnson were also involved on the final lap of the August 2011 Pocono race in which both made contact when battling for third place. The two would exchange words on pit road after the race.

Later in September 2011, when Busch was racing at the fall Richmond race after he and Johnson were told to settle down after Pocono; Busch accidentally made contact that resulted in Johnson spinning out in smoke. Almost 60 laps later, Johnson waited for Busch to come back around the track and intentionally retaliated by making contact resembling the previous spin. Although it looked like Busch would avoid the result of crashing, Busch was spun around when avoiding another car during the contact. Johnson was black-flagged for several laps because radio communications proved that Busch's first contact with Johnson was not intentional. After the race, Busch, satisfied with his top-five finish, called Johnson "a five-time chump-ion" and said he was in Johnson's head always. He then shook hands with Johnson during the post-race ceremonies to put the incident behind both of them.

Motorsports career results

NASCAR
(key) (Bold – Pole position awarded by qualifying time.  – Pole position earned by points standings or practice time. * – Most laps led.)

Cup Series

Daytona 500

Nationwide Series

Camping World Truck Series

 Season still in progress
 Ineligible for series points

24 Hours of Daytona
(key)

American open–wheel racing results
(key)

IndyCar Series

 ** Podium (Non-win) indicates second or third-place finishes.
 *** Top-tens (Non-podium) indicates fourth through tenth-place finishes.

Indianapolis 500

International Race of Champions
(key) (Bold – Pole position. * – Most laps led.)

References

External links
 
  
 10 Questions with Kurt Busch – July 2005 interview of the defending Nextel Cup champ , nascar.com
espn.go.com

1978 births
Living people
Sportspeople from the Las Vegas Valley
Racing drivers from Las Vegas
Racing drivers from Nevada
24 Hours of Daytona drivers
NASCAR drivers
International Race of Champions drivers
Dragster drivers
IndyCar Series drivers
Indianapolis 500 drivers
Indianapolis 500 Rookies of the Year
NASCAR Cup Series champions
University of Arizona alumni
American people of German descent
RFK Racing drivers
Team Penske drivers
Stewart-Haas Racing drivers
Chip Ganassi Racing drivers
NASCAR controversies
Kyle Busch Motorsports drivers
Multimatic Motorsports drivers
Wayne Taylor Racing drivers
Andretti Autosport drivers